Siva is the name of several rural localities in Russia:
Siva, Kirov Oblast, a village in Malmyzhsky District of Kirov Oblast
Siva, Perm Krai, a selo in Sivinsky District of Perm Krai